Abraham Wales is the name of:

Abraham Wales (footballer, born 1874)
Abraham Wales (footballer, born 1907)